Mimudea phoenicistis is a moth in the family Crambidae. It was described by George Hampson in 1896. It is found in India (Sikkim, Khasi Hills), Bhutan, Myanmar and Thailand.

References

Moths described in 1896
Spilomelinae